Sandown is a seaside resort and civil parish on the south-east coast of the Isle of Wight, United Kingdom with the resort  of Shanklin to the south and the settlement of Lake in between. Together with Shanklin, Sandown forms a built-up area of 21,374 inhabitants.

The northernmost town of Sandown Bay, Sandown has an easily accessible, sandy shoreline with beaches that run continuously from the cliffs at Battery Gardens in the south to Yaverland in the north.

Geography 

The town grew as a Victorian resort surrounded by a wealth of natural features.

The coastal and inland areas of Sandown are part of the Isle of Wight Biosphere Reserve designated by UNESCO's Man and the Biosphere Programme in June 2019, and Sandown's sea front and clifftops form part of the Isle of Wight Coastal Path.

The Bay that gives Sandown its name is an excellent example of a concordant coastline with five miles of well-developed tidal beaches stretching all the way from Shanklin to Culver Down due to Longshore drift. This makes Sandown Bay home to one of the longest unbroken beaches in the British Isles.

To the north-east of the town is Culver Down, a chalk down accessible to the public, mostly owned and managed by the National Trust. It supports typical chalk downland wildlife, and seabirds and birds of prey which nest on the cliffs.

Nearby are Sandown Levels in the flood plain of the River Yar, one of the few freshwater wetlands on the Isle of Wight, where Alverstone Mead Local Nature Reserve is popular for birdwatching. Sandown Meadows Nature Reserve, acquired by the Hampshire and Isle of Wight Wildlife Trust in 2012, is a place to spot kingfishers and water voles. Further inland, Borthwood Copse provides delightful woodland walks, with bluebells aplenty in the Spring.

The area's marine sub-littoral zone, including the reefs and seabed, is a Special Area of Conservation. At extreme low tide, a petrified forest can be revealed in the northern part of the Bay, and fragments of petrified wood are often washed up.

History 

There is some evidence for a pre-Roman settlement in the area. During the Roman period, it was a site of salt production.

Before the 19th century, Sandown was on the map chiefly for its military significance, with the Bay's beaches feared to offer easy landing spots for invaders from the Continent.

It is the site of the lost Sandown Castle. While undergoing construction in 1545, the fortification was attacked during the French invasion of the Isle of Wight when invaders fought their way over Culver Down from Whitecliff Bay before being repelled. The castle was built into the sea, prone to erosion and demolished fewer than a hundred years after it was built. In 1631, the castle was replaced by Sandham Fort  built further inland. In 1781, the fort's complement consisted of a master gunner and over twenty soldiers. Sandham Fort was demolished in the mid-19th century and is now the site of Sandham Gardens.

In the 1860s, five Palmerston Forts were built along the coast of Sandown Bay, including Granite Fort at Yaverland, now the Wildheart Animal Sanctuary. On the town's western cliffs Sandown Barrack Battery survives as a scheduled monument and Bembridge Fort, where the National Trust offers tours, can be seen on the downs to the north-east.

One of the first non-military buildings was Sandham Cottage or 'Villakin', a holiday home leased by the radical politician and one-time Mayor of London John Wilkes in the final years of the 18th century. See 'Sandown's famous connections' below.

The arrival of the railway in 1864 saw Sandown grow in size, with the town's safe bathing becoming increasingly popular. In the summer of 1874, the Crown Prince Frederick and Princess Victoria of Germany, their children and entourage rented several properties in the town and took regular dips in the Bay. Sandown's pier was built in the same decade, opening in May 1878, and extended in length in 1895.

The town laid further claim to becoming a fashionable English resort when the Ocean Hotel opened in 1899. The brainchild of West End theatrical impresario Henry Lowenfeld, the Ocean built on to and swallowed up the town's previous hotel of choice, the King's Head. For the new hotel's inauguration, a large number of dignitaries were invited from London, arriving in Sandown from Portsmouth by special boat. Guests had the chance to explore Sandown in coaches and carriages, and the hotel servants were all dressed in uniforms 'like admirals and post-captains' 

Sandown's destiny in the 20th century was to become a favourite bucket-and-spade destination for all classes. The Canoe Lake was opened in 1929 by the author Henry De Vere Stacpoole followed in 1932 by Brown's Golf Course (see below). The Art Deco Grand Hotel, opened next door to Brown's in April 1938, is now closed with planning permission for demolition granted in 2014.

Today, Sandown's esplanade has a mixture of former Victorian and Edwardian hotels with modern counterparts overlooking the beach and the Bay. A new Premier Inn opened in 2021. Sandown Pier has an amusement centre with arcade games, children's play areas and places to eat and drink. The pier's former landing stage is used for sea fishing.

Further north is the Wildheart Animal Sanctuary, formerly Isle of Wight Zoo. Established as Sandown Zoo in the 1950s, it was acquired by the Corney family in the 1970s and today specialises in rescued tigers, other big cats and primates. Nearby is the purpose-built Dinosaur Isle palaeontology centre which opened in 2001, and Sandham Gardens  which offers a dinosaur miniature golf course, attractions for children and young people, and bowls.

HMS Eurydice
On 24 March 1878, the Royal Navy training ship HMS Eurydice (1843) capsized and sank in Sandown Bay with the loss of 317 lives, one of Britain's worst peacetime naval disasters. The tops of the vessel's sunken masts were still visible from Sandown two months later on the day the town's pier was opened 

HMS Eurydice was refloated in August and beached at Yaverland to be pumped out, the subject of a painting by Henry Robins (1820-1892) for Queen Victoria who came over from Osborne House with other members of her family to see the wreck.

There is a memorial to crew of the Eurydice in the graveyard of Christ Church, Sandown.

Town Hall

Commissioned by the local board of health in 1869, the Grade II listed Sandown Town Hall is situated in Grafton Street. In March 2021, the Isle of Wight Council granted planning permission to convert the building for residential purposes and subsequently decided, in September 2021, to dispose of the Town Hall while exploring opportunities for community use.  In 2022, paint samples taken inside the building found evidence of a celebrated 1873 multi-coloured ceiling decoration by Henry Tooth, now hidden beneath layers of 20th century paint

Brown's Golf Course

Designed by one of the UK's leading players of the time Henry Cotton (golfer), the Brown's pitch and putt courses were the idea of south London pie and sausage maker Alex Kennedy. Opened on Sandown's eastern sea front in March 1932, the original clubhouse had the motto 'Golf for Everybody' emblazoned on its roof. Brown's and its ice cream factory were reportedly adapted in the 1940s to disguise pumping apparatus for Pipe Line Under the Ocean (PLUTO) intended to deliver oil to the D-Day beaches. The courses remain popular with all ages in the 21st century, and a conservation management plan for the 7.5-hectare site was published in July 2020

Sandown Carnival

The town's summer carnival has been entertaining visitors since 1889. Today's organisers put on a series of events including the popular Children's Carnival and Illuminated Carnival, Sandown Bay Regatta, and New Year's Day Celebrations with a fireworks display.

Since 2017, another popular Sandown get-together called Hullabaloo  has been held over a weekend in May, organised by Shademakers UK Carnival Club in collaboration with educational organisations, musicians, businesses and charities. 

In 2022, Hullabaloo will be held in October.

Isle of Wight Scooter Rally
Sandown is one of the main centres of this annual event which takes place over the August Bank Holiday weekend, attracting thousands of scooterists from all over the UK and other countries. 

A base for scooterists with entertainment and camping facilities is provided at Sandown Airport

Eating and drinking
Sandown offers an assortment of restaurants, cafes, bars and pubs along the sea front and in the town. They include the restored Bandstand restaurant on Culver Parade  with sweeping views of the Bay. Family-friendly 'gastro-pubs' include The Caulkheads in Avenue Road. Boojum and Snark at 105 High Street, opened in 2019 and inspired by author Lewis Carroll who stayed across the road in the 1870s, is the town's first sustainable microbrewery offering craft beers and ciders, and art exhibitions.

Transport

Sandown railway station is on the Island Line Railway, the Isle of Wight's one remaining public line from Ryde Pier Head to Shanklin.

Sandown is also served by buses run by Southern Vectis on routes 2, 3 and 8 with direct services to Bembridge, Newport, Ryde, Shanklin and Ventnor. Night buses are run on Fridays and Saturdays, along route 3.

Media location
The UK group Take That filmed the video for their fifth single I Found Heaven on Sandown's beaches and sea front in 1992 

Sandown High School and locations nearby were used in the 1972 film That'll Be The Day  starring David Essex, Ringo Starr, Billy Fury and Rosemary Leach.

The TV series Tiger Island on ITV and National Geographic in 2007 and 2008  chronicled the lives of the more than twenty tigers living at Isle of Wight Zoo.

Twin towns 
Sandown had a twinning (jumelée in French) arrangement with the town of Tonnay-Charente in the western French département of Charente-Maritime although the relationship was reported to be 'in tatters' in 2002. Sandown has also been twinned with the United States town of St. Pete Beach, Florida.

Namesakes 
 The town of Sandown and its Bay have inspired the naming of a number of Sandowns around the world, including Sandown, New Hampshire USA, Sandown, Gauteng a suburb of Johannesburg in South Africa, and Sandown Bay in South Africa's Western Cape.  The former industrial area of Sandown on the Parramatta River, New South Wales, Australia was commemorated by the Sandown railway line in the western suburbs of Sydney, which ceased passenger services in 1991. 
 HMS Sandown, launched in 1988, was the name ship in the Sandown class of mine countermeasures vessels. Its earlier namesake was the paddle steamer and passenger ferry PS Sandown which saw wartime service as a minesweeper.

Notable people 
 John Wilkes (former Lord Mayor of the City of London) stayed regularly in Sandown in the late 18th century at the place he called 'Villakin', also known as Sandham Cottage. A memorial plaque marks the site of the cottage close to the present-day High Street. On Sunday mornings, Wilkes would go to Shanklin Church, and after the service would walk across the fields to Knighton with David Garrick and his wife.
 Naturalist Charles Darwin worked on the abstract which became On the Origin of Species when staying at Sandown's King's Head Hotel in July 1858. He and his family later moved on to Norfolk House in nearby Shanklin. Darwin also visited the Isle of Wight on other occasions, and was photographed there by Julia Margaret Cameron in 1868.
 The writer George Eliot (Mary Ann Evans) stayed in Sandown during a two-week visit to the Isle of Wight in June 1863, having recently published her novels Romola and Silas Marner. Her celebrated work Middlemarch was published nine years later.
 Frederick III, German Emperor and his consort Victoria, Princess Royal, when Crown Prince and Princess of Germany, stayed at Sandown with their children for two months in the summer of 1874. Queen Victoria, the Crown Princess's mother, travelled from Osborne House to visit them on 31 July, an event she described in her journals  The German royals commissioned a stained glass window which can still be seen at Christ Church, Sandown to commemorate their stay in the town.
 The author Lewis Carroll, the Reverend Charles Lutwidge Dodgson, spent successive summers on Sandown sea front in the 1870s, staying first at the King's Head Hotel and later at Culverton House. In 1875, while he was writing The Hunting of the Snark, he met 9-year old Gertrude Chataway whose family was staying next door. The first edition of The Hunting of the Snark is dedicated to Gertrude.
 The composer Richard Strauss (1864-1949) spent summer holidays at Sandown's Ocean Hotel in 1902 and 1903. His sketchbooks show that, while there, he worked on his Symphonia Domestica and themes that found their way into Der Rosenkavalier
 Sir Isaac Pitman worked on his system of shorthand in Sandown in the 1860s 
 Cilla Black, Frankie Howerd, Tommy Cooper, Jimmy Tarbuck and Dickie Henderson were among the late 20th century performers doing summer seasons at Sandown Pier Pavilion 
 Oscar-winning film director and playwright Anthony Minghella was a pupil at Sandown High School   Members of the groups Level 42 and the Bees also went to Sandown High School and began their musical careers in Sandown.
 Edward Upward (1903-2009) long-lived author and part of the Auden Group in the 1930s, lived in Sandown from 1961 to 2004 
 James Clutterbuck, cricketer 
 William Darwin Fox, naturalist-clergyman, second cousin of Charles Darwin buried in Sandown.
 James Dore (1854-1925), a photographer who recorded hundreds of late Victorian and Edwardian images of Sandown and the Isle of Wight. The Isle of Wight Heritage Service holds a collection of his work    Dore was also a local councillor, Justice of the Peace and Sandown's Chief Fire Officer 
 Thomas Field Gibson FRG found some important fossils while staying at his beach house at Sandown.
Eric Charles Twelves Wilson V.C. was born in Sandown.
 Simon Moore, footballer who plays for Sheffield United.
 Mary Ellis, ATA Pilot 1941–1945, later managing director of Sandown Airport. Mary died in July 2018 aged 101

See also 
 Bembridge Down
 Sandown Bay
 Christ Church, Sandown
 Church of St. John the Evangelist, Sandown
 The Bay Church of England School
 List of current places of worship on the Isle of Wight

References

External links 

 Sandown Visitor Information
 Sandown Carnival website
 Hullabaloo website
 Official website of Sandown Town Council

 
Seaside resorts in England
Beaches of the Isle of Wight
Towns on the Isle of Wight
Civil parishes in the Isle of Wight